Mary Kerry Kennedy (born September 8, 1959) is an American lawyer, author and human rights activist. She is the seventh child and third daughter of Robert F. Kennedy and Ethel Skakel Kennedy. During her 15-year marriage to former New York Governor Andrew Cuomo, from 1990 to 2005, she was known as Kerry Kennedy-Cuomo. She is the president of Robert F. Kennedy Human Rights, a non-profit human rights advocacy organization.

Early life
Mary Kerry Kennedy was born in 1959, in Washington, D.C. to parents Robert F. Kennedy and Ethel Skakel. Three days after her birth, her father resigned as chief counsel of the Senate Rackets Committee to run his brother's campaign for presidency. She appeared, at age 3, in the 1963 Robert Drew documentary Crisis: Behind a Presidential Commitment, saying hello to U.S. Justice Department official Nicholas Katzenbach by phone from the office of her father, Robert F. Kennedy, Attorney General at the time.  Her father was assassinated in 1968. She is a graduate of The Putney School and Brown University and received her Juris Doctor from Boston College Law School.

Career

Activism
Since 1981, Kennedy has worked as a human rights activist, leading delegations into places such as El Salvador, Gaza, Haiti, Kenya, Northern Ireland, and South Korea
She was also involved in causes in China, Indonesia, Vietnam, India, Sudan, and Pakistan.

In 1988, Kennedy began serving as the president of the Robert F. Kennedy Center for Human Rights (now Robert F. Kennedy Human Rights). She was the executive director of the Robert F. Kennedy Memorial until 1995. She is the honorary president of the Robert F. Kennedy Foundation of Europe, based in Florence, Italy. She also branched the RFK Human Rights Foundation to Spain with the mission to promote the education about the defense of human rights worldwide.  Since 2018, Kennedy is working side by side with the President of the RFK Human Rights Spain appointed by her, María Díaz de la Cebosa, to increase the number of citizens with a working knowledge of human rights concepts. 

Kennedy is the chair of the Amnesty International Leadership Council, and her writing has been published in The Boston Globe, The Chicago Sun-Times, and The New York Times. She also serves on the advisory board of the Columbia Center on Sustainable Investment at Columbia University.

Kennedy also travels the country giving speeches and presentations and calling on her audiences to stand up and fight against human rights violations. In 2017, Kennedy received the Medal for Social Activism from the World Summit of Nobel Peace Laureates in Bogota, Colombia for "her impactful efforts on communities throughout the world as a result of her life-long devotion to the pursuit of equal justice."

Being Catholic Now

Kennedy is the editor of Being Catholic Now, Prominent Americans talk about Change in the Church and the Quest for Meaning; Crown Publishing, Sept. 2008; .  The book includes essays from prominent Catholics, including Nancy Pelosi, Cokie Roberts, now-former Cardinal McCarrick, Sister Joan Chittister, Tom Monaghan, Bill O'Reilly, Doris Kearns Goodwin, Doug Brinkley and others.

Robert F. Kennedy: Ripples of Hope
In 2018, Kennedy published Robert F. Kennedy: Ripples of Hope: Kerry Kennedy in Conversation with Heads of State, Business Leaders, Influencers, and Activists about Her Father's Impact on Their Lives. The book contains interviews from prominent individuals whose lives and careers were influenced by the legacy of Robert F. Kennedy, and explores how Kennedy's legacy touched the fields of entertainment, politics, faith, and activism. Interviewees include Tony Bennett, Harry Belafonte, Bono, Barack Obama, John Lewis and activists including Gloria Steinem and Marian Wright Edelman.

Human rights work

Kennedy's life has been devoted to equal justice, to the promotion and protection of basic rights, and to the preservation of the rule of law. Kennedy is the president of Robert F. Kennedy Human Rights. She started working in the field of human rights in 1981 as an intern with Amnesty International, where she investigated abuses committed by U.S. immigration officials against refugees from the Salvadoran Civil War in El Salvador.

For over thirty years, she has worked on diverse human rights issues such as children's rights, child labor, disappearances, indigenous land rights, judicial independence, freedom of expression, ethnic violence, impunity, and the environment. She has concentrated specifically on women's rights, particularly honor killings, sexual slavery, domestic violence, workplace discrimination, and sexual assault. She has worked in over 60 countries and led hundreds of human rights delegations.

Kennedy established RFK Center Partners for Human Rights in 1986 to ensure the protection of rights codified under the U.N. Declaration of Human Rights. RFK Partners provides  support to courageous human rights defenders around the world. The Center uncovers human rights abuses like torture, repression of free speech and child labor; urges Congress and the U.S. administration to highlight human rights in foreign policy; and supplies activists with the resources they need to advance their work. Kennedy also founded RFK Compass, which works on sustainable investing with leaders in the financial community. She started the RFK Training Institute in Florence, Italy, which offers courses of study to leading human rights defenders across the globe.

Kennedy is the author of Speak Truth to Power: Human Rights Defenders Who Are Changing Our World, which features interviews with human rights activists including Marian Wright Edelman, the Dalai Lama, Archbishop Desmond Tutu, Elie Wiesel, and more. This book has been translated into 6 languages, with more coming, and has been adapted into a play by Ariel Dorfman. It also is the foundation for the RFK Center's Speak Truth To Power program - a multi-faceted global initiative that uses the experiences of courageous defenders from around the world to educate students and others about human rights, and urge them to take action. The curriculum focuses on issues ranging from slavery and environmental activism to religious self-determination and political participation 

Kennedy has appeared numerous times on ABC, NBC, CBS, CNN and PBS as well as on networks in countries around the world, and her commentaries and articles have been published in The Boston Globe, The Chicago Sun-Times, L'Unita, The Los Angeles Times, Marie Claire, The New York Times, Página/12, TV Guide, and the Yale Journal of International Law.   As a special correspondent for the environmental magazine television program, Network Earth, she reported on human rights and the environment.  She interviewed human rights leaders for Voice of America.

Kennedy is Chair of the Amnesty International USA Leadership Council.  Nominated by President Bush and confirmed by the Senate, she serves on the board of directors of the United States Institute of Peace, as well as Human Rights First, and Inter Press Service (Rome, Italy). She is a patron of the Bloody Sunday Trust (Northern Ireland) and serves on the Editorial Board of Advisors of the Buffalo Human Rights Law Review. She is on the Advisory Committee for the International Campaign for Tibet, the Committee on the Administration of Justice of Northern Ireland, the Global Youth Action Network, Studies without Borders and several other organizations. She serves on the leadership council of the Amnesty International Campaign to Stop Violence Against Women and on the Advisory Board of the Albert Schweitzer Institute and the National Underground Railroad Freedom Center's National Advisory Council.

Kennedy was named Woman of the Year 2001 by Save the Children, Humanitarian of the Year Award from the South Asian Media Awards Foundation, and the Prima Donna Award from Montalcino Vineyards. In 2008, she received the Eleanor Roosevelt Medal of Honor and the Thomas More Award from Boston College Law School. World Vision and International AIDS Trust gave her the 2009 Human Rights Award.

She has received awards from the Southern Christian Leadership Conference (for leadership in abolishing the death penalty), the American Jewish Congress of the Metropolitan Region, and the Institute for the Italian American experience three I's award for outstanding efforts and achievements for human rights.

Lawyers for Ecuadorean plaintiffs in the long-running lawsuit against Chevron Corporation for environmental and human health damages at the Lago Agrio oil field hired Kennedy to conduct public relations for their cause. She traveled to Ecuador in 2009, after which she blasted Chevron in an article for the Huffington Post. Neither her Huffington Post piece nor the news coverage of her advocacy disclosed that she was being paid by the plaintiffs, a fact not made public until 2012. The plaintiffs' lead American lawyer reportedly paid Kennedy $50,000 in February 2010, and the plaintiffs' law firm budgeted $10,000 per month for her services, plus $40,000 in expenses in June 2010. Kennedy was also reportedly given a 0.25 percent share of any money collected from Chevron, worth US$40 million if the full amount were to be collected. Kennedy responded that she was "paid a modest fee for the time I spent on the case," but denied that she had any financial interest in the outcome.

Bail reform
Kennedy is a long-time activist for bail reform in New York and nationally. Her work includes campaigns in support of community bail funds like The Bronx Defenders, as well as direct activism in providing bail funds for minors held in pretrial detention at Rikers Island and other adult facilities across the country.

Kennedy has criticized the treatment of New York teenager Kalief Browder during his extended time in pretrial detention at Rikers Island. This included video recordings of guards beating Browder, withholding food, and denying medical treatment. In 2016, Kennedy campaigned for adoption of S 5998-A/A 8296-A, referred to as “Kalief's Law,” in the [New York State Legislature], which would have guaranteed speedy trials to defendants being held in pretrial detention. On June 9, 2016, the New York State Assembly passed Kalief's Law by a 138-2 margin. The law was not voted on by the New York State Senate in 2016, and has been reintroduced by State Senator Daniel L. Squadron during the 2017-2018 legislative session as S 1998-A.

Kennedy remains a major voice in the campaign for speedy trial reform in New York, writing in a 2017 New York Daily News editorial that “we make a mockery out of the promise” of a speedy trial. Kennedy has also worked closely with the Katal Center for Health, Equity and Justice to campaign for passage of speedy trial reform and criminal justice reform before the New York Assembly.

On June 21, 2017, Kennedy, through her organization, Robert F. Kennedy Human Rights, posted the $100,000 bail for Pedro Hernandez, a 17-year-old who had spent over a year in pretrial detention at Rikers Island in connection with a shooting investigation. Hernandez had become the face of bail reform following extensive reporting on his incarceration by Daily News columnist Shaun King.

Hernandez's bail had initially been set at over $250,000, but that sum was lowered to $100,000 after Robert F. Kennedy Human Rights argued such a high sum was disproportional. Less than a week after his release from Rikers Island, Bronx District Attorney Darcel D. Clark announced she would no longer pursue a case against Hernandez. On October 9, 2018, all remaining charges against Hernandez were dropped on the condition he attend college.

Break Bread, Not Families campaign
On June 21, 2018, in response to President Donald Trump's decision to enact a 'zero-tolerance' policy of family separation on immigrants entering the United States illegally, Kennedy joined organizations including the Dolores Huerta Foundation, the Texas Civil Rights Project and La Union Del Pueblo Entero to launch the 'Break Bread Not Families Immigration Fast and Prayer Chain. The campaign, which raised funds to support the reunification of immigrant families, argued Trump administration policy was "not only immoral, it is also illegal under U.S. and international law."

On June 23, 2018, the Break Bread Not Families campaign held a prayer vigil in the American border town of McAllen, Texas. The vigil marked the start of the campaign encouraged activists, political figures and celebrities to fast for 24 hours before passing the fast to another public figure. Participants included former United States Secretary of Housing and Urban Development Julian Castro, United States Senator Ed Markey, Congresswomen Rosa DeLauro, Barbara Lee and Annie McLane Kuster, Congressman Joseph P. Kennedy III, and actors such as Aisha Tyler, Alfre Woodard, Julia Roberts, Lena Dunham, and Evan Rachel Wood.

Kennedy joined protestors outside the Ursula Detention Center, where they temporarily blocked a bus of immigrant children from departing. Kennedy was threatened with arrest by U.S. Customs and Border Protection agents after repeatedly attempting to speak with officials inside Ursula about the use of chain-link cages to house children separated from their families.

The next day, Kennedy and Dolores Huerta led a march and rally outside the federal immigration camp in Tornillo, Texas in solidarity with the then-2,400 child immigrants in facilities like Tornillo. On July 18, 2018, Robert F. Kennedy Human Rights spokesman Max Burns reported that the campaign had raised "nearly $40,000 to support undocumented families seeking their children...from over 650 small, individual donors."

Honors
Kennedy holds honorary doctorates of law from Le Moyne College and University of San Francisco Law School, and of Humane Letters from Bay Path College and the Albany College of Pharmacy. She is also a member of the Massachusetts and District of Columbia bar associations.

Personal life
On June 9, 1990, she married Andrew Cuomo at age 30 in the Cathedral of St. Matthew the Apostle in Washington, DC. They have three daughters: twins Cara Ethel Kennedy-Cuomo and Mariah Matilda Kennedy-Cuomo (born 1995), and Michaela Andrea Kennedy-Cuomo (born 1997). Kennedy and Cuomo divorced in 2005.

Acquittal on drugged-driving charges
In July 2012, Kennedy allegedly sideswiped a tractor trailer on Interstate 684 in Westchester County. On the morning of July 13, 2012, Kennedy was found in her white Lexus. A police report said Kennedy had trouble speaking, was swaying and told an officer that she may have accidentally taken a sleeping pill earlier that day. In a court appearance on July 17, 2012, Kennedy said local hospital tests found no traces of drugs and that her doctor believed she had suffered a seizure. Kennedy pleaded not guilty to driving while impaired. Kennedy was charged by state police with leaving the scene of an accident. A toxicology report filed on July 25, 2012, said zolpidem was found in a sample of her blood taken when Kennedy was arrested, at which point Kennedy released a statement saying in part, "The results we received today from the Westchester County lab showed trace amounts of a sleep aid in my system, so it now appears that my first instinct was correct. I am deeply sorry to all those I endangered that day, and am enormously grateful for the support I have received over the past two weeks." Kennedy said she did not remember anything after entering a highway to go to a gym and before she found herself at a traffic light with a police officer at her door.

On January 23, 2014, Judge Robert Neary ruled that the drugged-driving case against Kennedy would move forward. The judge acknowledged that she was "not a typical criminal defendant. She has achieved a great deal and is dedicated to good works." Despite this, the judge said dismissal might lead the public to believe "that there are two justice systems: one for the rich and powerful, and one for everybody else." On February 20, 2014, jury selection for her trial began. Kennedy was not present, and was instead in Brussels and the Western Sahara conducting human rights advocacy. Sixty-two people were interviewed for the six-person panel. Kennedy's sister Rory testified that she had "a reputation for sobriety and general healthy living." Both Rory and their mother Ethel were present in the courtroom during the trial. Ethel was pushed in a wheelchair inside the Westchester County Courthouse and was accompanied by her sons Robert F. Kennedy, Jr. and Douglas Harriman Kennedy. Kennedy's attorney Gerald Lefcourt told jurors that while she did not expect her famous name to give her any advantages, Kennedy should not be punished for it either. Kennedy admitted to having been in a car wreck 18 months before the incident, as well as suffering a head injury that required medication.

Kennedy was acquitted of the charges on February 28, 2014. "You have to wonder why this ill-advised prosecution was brought," Lefcourt said after the verdict. "Was it because of who the defendant is? They concede it was accidental and nevertheless pursued this case. I find this very depressing." Prosecutors defended their actions. "This case was treated no differently from any of the others," Lucian Chalfen, spokesman for the Westchester County District Attorney said. On March 3, 2014, Kennedy appeared on NBC's Today and criticized Westchester County for prosecuting "people who the district attorney and police believe to be innocent of the crime, simply because of county protocol requiring all cases to be pursued."

References

External links
 
 Kerry Kennedy talks with NPR's Tavis Smiley about her father's legacy on the 35th anniversary of his death
 Requests for her designation as a non-grata persona
 

1959 births
Activists from Massachusetts
American people of Dutch descent
American people of Irish descent
American Roman Catholics
Boston College Law School alumni
Brown University alumni
Cuomo family
Living people
People from Washington, D.C.
Lawyers from Washington, D.C.
Robert F. Kennedy
Kerry
American human rights activists
Women human rights activists
The Putney School alumni